Charles Lionel Broad (1 December 1945 – 4 September 2019) was a New Zealand cricketer and veterinarian. 

Broad was born in England in 1945, and moved to New Zealand with his family in 1947. A middle-order batsman and off-spin bowler, he played for the Buller cricket team when he was 16 and living in Westport, and later represented New Zealand Universities while studying at Lincoln College and Massey University. He played in three first-class matches for Canterbury in 1966/67. In his second Plunket Shield match he scored 27 and 43 and took 2 for 34 and 5 for 61 against Auckland. 

Broad decided to concentrate on his veterinary career, and played no first-class cricket after the age of 21. He established the Animal & Bird Hospital in Christchurch in the 1970s.

See also
 List of Canterbury representative cricketers

References

External links
 

1945 births
2019 deaths
Canterbury cricketers
Cricketers from Epsom
Lincoln University (New Zealand) alumni
Massey University alumni
New Zealand cricketers
New Zealand veterinarians